Martin Cseh (born 22 August 1988 in Trenčín) is a Slovak football defender, he is currently playing for FC Andau in the Austrian II. Liga Nord.

References

External links
 

1988 births
Living people
Sportspeople from Trenčín
Association football fullbacks
Slovak footballers
Bohemians 1905 players
ŠK Slovan Bratislava players
Slovak Super Liga players
Czech First League players
Slovak expatriate footballers
Slovak expatriate sportspeople in the Czech Republic
Expatriate footballers in the Czech Republic
Expatriate footballers in Poland